Cybistra or Kybistra, earlier known as Ḫubišna, was a town of ancient Cappadocia or Cilicia. Its site is located about 10km northeast of the modern town of Ereğli in Konya Province, Turkey. It was the capital of a Luwian-speaking Neo-Hittite kingdom in the 1st millennium BCE.

History

Bronze Age
Ḫubišna was first mentioned in the texts of the Hittite Empire, as a country located in southern Anatolia, in the part of the Lower Land corresponding to the later Classical Tyanitis. The main city of Ḫubišna was located at the site corresponding to present-day .

According to the Telepinu Proclamation, Ḫubišna was one of the places which the 17th century BCE Hittite king Labarna I had conquered and over which he had subsequently appointed his sons as rulers.

During the 16th century BCE, the Hittite king Ammuna carried out several military campaigns to attempt to re-subjugate former states which had revolted against Hittite suzerainty, including Ḫubišna.

Iron Age

After the collapse of the Hittite Empire, Ḫubišna became one of the Syro-Hittite states constituting the Tabal confederation, in whose southern regions it was located.

Little is known about the kingdom of Ḫubišna. The king Puḫame of Ḫubišna became a vassal of the Neo-Assyrian Empire after the Assyrian king Shalmaneser III passed through it during his campaign against Tabal in 837 or 836 BCE. A later king of Ḫubišna was Uirimi, who was mentioned in the records of the Neo-Assyrian Empire as one of five kings who offered tribute to Tiglath-Pileser III in 738 and 737 BCE.

In 679 BCE, the Assyrian king Esarhaddon defeated the Cimmerians and killed their king Teušpa at Ḫubišna.

Classical antiquity
Strabo, after mentioning Tyana, says "that not far from it are Castabala and Cybistra, forts which are still nearer to the mountain," by which he means Taurus. Cybistra and Castabala were in that division of Cappadocia which was called Cilicia. Strabo makes it six days' journey from Mazaca to the Pylae Ciliciae, through Tyana, which is about half way; then he makes it 300 stadia, or about two days' journey, from Tyana to Cybistra, which leaves about a day's journey from Cybistra to the Pylae. William Martin Leake observed, "We learn also from the Table that Cybistra was on the road from Tyana to Mazaca, and sixty-four Roman miles from the former." Ptolemy places Cybistra in Cataonia. 

When Cicero was proconsul of Cilicia (51/50 BCE), he led his troops southwards towards the Taurus through that part of Cappadocia which borders on Cilicia, and he encamped "on the verge of Cappadocia, not far from Taurus, at a town Cybistra, in order to defend Cilicia, and at the same time hold Cappadocia. Cicero stayed five days at Cybistra, and on hearing that the Parthians were a long way off that entrance into Cappadocia, and were hanging on the borders of Cilicia, he immediately marched into Cilicia through the Pylae of the Taurus, and came to Tarsus. This is quite consistent with Strabo.

Bishopric 
Cybistra was from an early stage a Christian bishopric, as shown by the participation of its bishop Timotheus in the First Council of Nicaea in 325. Cyrus took part in the Council of Chalcedon in 351 and was a signatory of the letter that the bishops of the Roman province of Cappadocia Secunda, to which Cybistra belonged, sent in 458 to Byzantine Emperor Leo I the Thracian after the murder of Proterius of Alexandria. The diocese no longer appears in Notitiae Episcopatuum from the end of the 15th century.

No longer a residential bishopric, Cybistra is today listed by the Catholic Church as a titular see.

List of titular bishops
 Nicasio Balisa y Melero, O.A.R. (14 January 1941 to 3 February 1965)
 Jacques-Antoine-Claude-Marie Boudinet (11 March 1856 to 16 June 1856)
 Philippe François Zéphirin Guillemin, M.E.P. (8 August 1856 to 5 April 1886)
 Eduard Herrmann (Hermann) (30 August 1901 to 3 March 1916)
 Johannes Baptist Katschthaler (4 June 1891 to 17 December 1900)
 Paul Nègre (7 December 1916 to 7 February 1940)
 Alexander Paterson (14 May 1816 to 30 October 1831)
 Martin Poell, O.F.M. (20 June 1890 to 2 January 1891)

References

Sources

 
 
 

Former populated places in Turkey
Geography of Konya Province
Populated places of the Byzantine Empire
Populated places in ancient Cappadocia
Populated places in ancient Cilicia
Catholic titular sees in Asia